This is a list of Italian television related events from 1998.

Events

RAI 

 October 13: During a special evening of Porta a porta for Pope John Paul II’s twenty years of pontificate, the pope himself phones on air to thank the host Bruno Vespa.

Debuts

RAI

Miniseries 

 Le ragazze di Piazza di Spagna (The Piazza di Spagna girls) – by various directors, with Romina Mondello, Vittoria Belvedere and Alice Evans; 3 seasons. Inspired by the 1952 film Three girls from Rome, it is the story of three young would-be models.

Serials 

 Incantesimo (Charm) – soap opera set in a clinic in Rome, with Agnese Nano, Paola Pitagora and Delia Boccardo; 10 seasons.

News and educational 

 Blu notte – Misteri italiani (Night blue, Italian mysteries) – 12 seasons. True crime program, hosted by the mystery writer Carlo Lucarelli; the show, in the first seasons focused on the common crimes, later is extended to the Italian history’s mysteries, as the Piazza Fontana bombing.

Fininvest

Variety 

 Ciao Darwin (Hallo Darwin) – game show hosted by Paolo Bonolis and Luca Laurenti; again on air.  The theory of the natural selection is the pretext for burlesque tests of skill between diverse categories of persons and for exhibiting female flesh. The program, despite the charges to be “TV trash”, is now again one of the top Mediaset shows and the format has been largely imitated abroad.

Television shows

RAI

Drama 
 Nicholas’ gift – by Robert Markowitz, with Alan Bates and Jamie Lee Curtis, based on the true story of Nicholas Green; coproduced by LUX VIDE.
Jeremiah by Harry Winer, with Patrick Dempsey and Oliver Reed; ninth chapter of the LUX Vide Bible project.
Più leggero non basta (Lighter is not enough) – by Elisabetta Lodoli, with Stefano Accorsi and Giovanna Mezzogiorno; drama about the disability.
La piovra 9 – Il patto (The pact) – with Raoul Bova and Anja Kling;2 episodes. Second prequel of La piovra franchise, but with a plot almost fully on its now, set in the Catania of the Sixties.

Fininvest

Drama 

 Ultimo (Last) – by Stefano Reali, with Raoul Bova and Ricky Memphis; 2 episodes. Reconstruction, very fictionalized, of the Totò Riina’s capture by a special force of carabineers, led by the “Commander Last” (Sergio Di Caprio). The movie has 4 sequels.

Miniseries 
Anni ’50 (The Fifties) – by Carlo Vanzina, with Ezio Greggio; 4 episodes. The series is a tribute to Bread, love and dreams and to the Italian neorealist comedies.

Serials 

 Professione fantasma (Profession ghost) – by Vittorio De Sisti, with Massimo Lopez and Edy Angelillo. The ghost of a private eye remains on earth to watch over his girl-friend.

Variety 

 Italia Unz – show of disco music from the Riccione water park, care of the Radio Deejay  team.

References 

1998 in Italian television